Finished with the Dogs is the second album by Holy Moses, released in 1987 on AAARRG Records. It was re-released on August 5, 2005 through Armageddon with 4 bonus live tracks. 
All music and lyrics are by Andy Classen and Sabina Classen.

Track listing 
 "Finished with the Dogs" - 2:31
 "Current of Death" - 2:38
 "Criminal Assault" - 3:22
 "In the Slaughterhouse" - 2:32
 "Fortress of Desperation" - 3:52
 "Six Fat Women" - 2:58
 "Corroded Dreams" - 4:01
 "Life's Destroyer" - 2:55
 "Rest in Pain" - 3:17
 "Military Service" - 3:39

2005 reissue bonus tracks 
 "Road Crew"
 "Life's Destroyer" (live in Bad Salzungen - Wacken Roadshow - May 2005)
 "Current of Death" (live in Munich - Wacken Roadshow - May 2005)
 "In the Slaughterhouse" (live in Munich - Wacken Roadshow - May 2005)
 "Finished with the Dogs" (live in Stonehenge Festival, Holland - July 2004)

Personnel 
 Sabina Classen - vocals
 Andy Classen - guitars, backing vocals (lead vocals on "Road Crew")
 Andre Chapalier - bass
 Uli Kusch - drums, backing vocals

1987 albums
Holy Moses albums